K. R. Savithri (born 25 July 1952) is an Indian actress in Malayalam movies. She is one of the prominent supporting actresses in Malayalam and Tamil movies. She is born at Thiruthani. Her father is from Andhra Pradesh and mother is from Kerala. Actresses K. R. Vijaya and K. R. Vatsala are her sisters. Her daughters Anusha and Ragasudha are also actresses. She currently resides at Chennai with family.

Filmography

Malayalam
Chuzhi (1976)
Aadarsham (1982)
Yudham (1983)
Parasparam (1983)
Yaathra (1985)
Sannaham (1985)
Shaantham Bheekaram (1985)
Thammil Kandappol (1985)
Desatanakkili Karayarilla (1986)
Gandhinagar 2nd Street (1986)
Snehamulla Simham (1986)
Padayani (1986)
Koodanayum Kattu (1986)
Sreedharante Onnaam Thirumurivu (1987) as Aswathy's mother
Anuraagi (1988)
Ormayil Ennum (1988)
Oozham (1988)
Jeevitham Oru Raagam (1989)
Veena Meettiya Vilangukal (1990)
Samrajyam (1990) as Shah's wife
Mridula (1990)
Vacation (1990)
Onnaam Muhoortham (1991)
Amaram (1991)
Bhoomika (1991)
Welcome to Kodaikkanal (1992) as Aunty
Kudumbasametham (1992) as Rema
Arabia (1995) as Bhairavi's mother
Sulthan Hyderali (1996) as Arif Hussain's wife
Oru Yathramozhi (1997)

Tamil
Punitha Anthoniyar (1976)
Kai Varisai (1983) 
Andha June 16-Am Naal (1984)
En Uyir Nanban (1984)
Veeran Veluthambi (1987)
Cooliekkaran (1987)
Manaivi Oru Mandhiri (1988)
Aval Mella Sirithal (1988)
Sahadevan Mahadevan (1988)
Maduraikara Thambi (1988)
Sattathin Marupakkam (1989)
Thalattu Padava (1990)
Salem Vishnu  (1990)
Agni Theertham (1990)
Thaali Kattiya Raasa (1992)
Pudhiya Mugam (1993)
Veluchami (1995)
Thuraimugam (1996)
Ilasu Pudhusu Ravusu (2003)
Selvam (2005)
Ezhuthiyatharadi (2008)

Telugu
 Jagan (1984)

Television
 Thendral (TV series)

References

External links

Actresses from Tamil Nadu
Actresses in Malayalam cinema
Indian film actresses
Actresses in Tamil cinema
Living people
People from Tiruvallur district
20th-century Indian actresses
21st-century Indian actresses
1948 births
Actresses in Telugu cinema